The 2019 Sultan Azlan Shah Cup was the 28th edition of the Sultan Azlan Shah Cup. It was held in Ipoh, Malaysia from 23 until 30 March.

The number of teams for this year's cup is the same as last year's tournament where six teams competed. India, Canada, Japan, Malaysia, Poland, and South Korea participated in this edition of the Sultan Azlan Shah Cup.

South Korea won the tournament for the third time after defeating India 4–2 on penalties, after the match ended in a draw at 1–1, in the final.

Teams
Argentina, Australia, and England who competed in the past tournament did not participate this year due to the 2019 Men's FIH Pro League. Canada, Japan, and South Korea are the teams replacing them.

Ireland withdrew from the tournament a month before it began. Poland was invited to replace South Africa (the team planned to replace Ireland), who were not able to finance flight tickets.

Results
All times are local, MYT (UTC+8).

Pool

Classification round

Fifth and sixth place

Third and fourth place

Final

Statistics

Final standings

Goalscorers

Awards
Five awards were awarded during the tournament, they were:
Fairplay: 
Best Player:  Surender Kumar
Man of the Match (Final):  Jang Jong-hyun
Best Goalkeeper:  Kim Jae-hyeon
Top Scorer:  Mandeep Singh &  Jang Jong-hyun (7 goals each)

See also
2019 Sultan of Johor Cup

References

2019
2019 in field hockey
March 2019 sports events in Malaysia
2019 in Malaysian sport